Justice is a contemporary Christian music album by Steve Camp and was released by Sparrow Records in 1989. Camp had begun to put more emphasis publicly on issues not normally addressed in evangelical Christian circles. This album is best known for featuring his version of the song "Do You Feel Their Pain", which featured him singing alongside BeBe Winans, the provocatively titled "Don't Tell Them Jesus Loves Them" ("...till you're ready to love them too..."), and Larry Norman's "Great American Novel".

Track listing 
All tracks by Steve Camp and Rob Frazier except where noted.

 "Justice" - 4:35
 "Playing Marbles with Diamonds" - 5:05
 "Don't Tell Them Jesus Loves Them" - 5:19
 "Living Dangerously in the Hands of God" - 5:04
 "Do You Feel Their Pain?" (Camp, Frazier, Kim Maxfield-Camp, Phil McHugh) - 6:18
 "Hell is Burning While the Church Sleeps" - 4:26
 "Great American Novel" (Larry Norman) - 4:57
 "Servants without Scars" - 4:04
 "Love That Will Not Let Me Go" - 5:09
 "I Believe in You" - 4:25

Personnel 

 Steve Camp – lead vocals, arrangements, acoustic piano, synthesizers (4), drum machine programming (4)
 Phil Madeira – organ (1, 10)
 John Andrew Schreiner – synthesizers (2, 3, 5, 7, 8, 10)
 Carl Marsh – Fairlight programming (5, 6)
 Phil Naish – synthesizers (7)
 James Hollihan – guitars (1)
 Dave Perkins – guitars (1)
 Michael Landau – guitars (2, 3, 5–8)
 Al Perkins – pedal steel guitar (7)
 Jerry McPherson – guitars (8, 10)
 Leland Sklar – bass (1, 2, 3, 5–8, 10)
 Chris McHugh – drums (1)
 Carlos Vega – drums (2, 3, 5–8, 10)
 Terry McMillan – percussion (1–5, 8), harmonica (1, 8)
 Jim Horn – saxophone solo (5, 10)
 Paul Buckmaster – orchestration (3, 5, 9)
 The London Symphony Orchestra – strings (3, 5, 9)
 Ashley Cleveland – backing vocals (1–8, 10)
 Marty McCall – backing vocals (1, 2, 3, 5, 6, 8, 10)
 Pam Tillis – backing vocals (1, 2, 3, 6)
 Rob Frazier – backing vocals (2, 4)
 Kim Maxfield-Camp – backing vocals (5)
 Rosemary Butler – backing vocals (5, 7, 8, 10)
 The Bobby Jones Nashville Choir – backing vocals (5)
 BeBe Winans – vocal solo (5)
 Margaret Becker – vocal solo (5)
 Steve Green – vocal solo (5)

Production

 Steve Camp – producer
 David Schober – engineer
 Wade Jennings – assistant engineer
 Howard Steel – assistant engineer
 Carry Summers – assistant engineer
 Kevin Twit – assistant engineer
 Bill Schnee Studios, North Hollywood, California – recording location, mixing location
 The Bennett House, Franklin, Tennessee – recording location
 OmniSound Studios, Nashville, Tennessee – recording location, mixing location
 Bill Schnee – mixing (1, 3, 5, 9)
 Jeff Balding – mixing (2, 4, 7, 10)
 David Schober – mixing (6, 8)
 Mama Jo's Recording Studio, North Hollywood, California – mixing location
 Doug Sax – mastering at The Mastering Lab, Los Angeles, California
 Barbara Catanzaro-Hearn – art direction
 Peter Nomura – design and artwork
 Mark Tucker – collage photography 
 Victoria Pearson – portrait photography

Use in media 
 The song "Don't Tell Them Jesus Loves Them" was used in the 1990 film, Geronimo.

References 

1988 albums
Steve Camp albums
Sparrow Records albums